Murrawal is a location on the now closed Gwabegar railway line in north-western New South Wales, Australia. A loop and loading bank station  was located there between 1917 and 1972.

Murrawal is on the Castlereagh River in the Bungaba Parish, a civil parish of Napier County.

References

Localities in New South Wales
Central West (New South Wales)